Klastline Cone is a cinder cone in northwestern British Columbia, Canada, located near Mount Edziza in Mount Edziza Provincial Park. It last erupted during the Pleistocene epoch.

See also
List of volcanoes in Canada
List of Northern Cordilleran volcanoes
Volcanism of Canada
Volcanism of Western Canada

References

Cinder cones of British Columbia
Pleistocene volcanoes
Monogenetic volcanoes
Mount Edziza volcanic complex
One-thousanders of British Columbia